Dagenham Dock is a place in the London Borough of Barking and Dagenham in London, England. It is located to the south of Dagenham and on the River Thames. It was once the site of a large coaling port and continues to be the location of a small terminal licensed to handle coal off-loading. Today the site is used for a number of river-related uses including a  TDG (now Norbert Dentressangle) depot with around 200 tanks for storage of petrol, distillates, aviation fuel, biofuels, tallow, ethanol, fertilisers, urea etc.

History
The dock was constructed at the site of Dagenham Breach, an area of flooded marsh caused by the breaching of the sea wall in 1707, and repeatedly flooded in the 18th Century. After a number of failed attempts, in 1865 Sir John Rennie built a jetty and a branch railway, but the company failed financially. Historic records of Samuel Williams & Sons and John Hudson Ltd are held at Barking and Dagenham Archive Service, Valence House Museum although the full collection has not yet been fully catalogued.

Early in the 20th century, HMS Thunderer, the last major warship built on the Thames, was fitted out at a new jetty, still known as the Thunderer Jetty.

Wholesale market
Barking Reach Power Station was constructed between 1992 and 1995 on Chequers Lane, and was the first major generating station to be built in London for many years. Decommissioning of the power station started in 2018. 

In December 2018, the City of London Corporation acquired Barking Power Ltd along with the Barking Reach Power Station site. The historic City of London Corporation is obliged to provide wholesale markets through legislation enacted in the Victorian era. It proposes to relocate Billingsgate Fish Market (currently in Poplar), Smithfield Meat Market (Central London) and New Spitalfields Market (Leyton) to a new consolidated site.

The corporation considered potential sites in Silvertown, Fairlop, Thurrock and Dagenham Dock and the possible expansion of the New Spitalfields site in Leyton. The Barking Reach Power Station site was selected in April 2019. In March 2021, Barking and Dagenham Council gave outline planning permission for the City of London Corporation proposals. On 28 November 2022 the corporation submitted a private bill to allow the relocation of Smithfield and Billingsgate markets.

In 2023 Havering Council attempted to use the 1247 market rights of Romford Market to block the opening of the consolidated wholesale market to the general public.

The new consolidated market is expected to become operational in 2027/2028.

Geography
The area is located in the London Riverside section of the Thames Gateway zone. It includes the London Sustainable Industries Park, an environmentally sustainable business cluster.

Expansion of the little-used Dagenham Dock railway station is expected to aid the development including services on the Docklands Light Railway and East London Transit. 

East of Dagenham Dock is Hornchurch Marshes, west past The Gores waterway is Barking Riverside, to the south is the River Thames and to the north is the Merrielands Retail Park and the Becontree and Rylands estates.

See also
Port of London

References

Thames Gateway
Areas of London
Districts of the London Borough of Barking and Dagenham
Port of London
Districts of London on the River Thames
Dagenham